Northfield High School (NHS) is a comprehensive, public high school in  Northfield, Minnesota, United States. The school was built in 1966, with additions in 1993 and 1997. The school hosts grades 9-12. As of 2020 there are 1,235 students and 146 faculty members. This includes the schools 85 teaching staff, administrative, custodial, kitchen, and special ed staff. Northfield High School is known to have a rich tradition in academic excellence.

The school is a part of Northfield Public Schools (ISD #659), and is affiliated with the Minnesota State High School League (MSHSL). The school is a member of the Big 9 Conference.

History

The first schoolhouse was built because of Ann North (wife of founder John W. North) less than a year after the town was founded.
In 1910, a new high school was built for $90,000.  This building was located right next to downtown Northfield.  At the time it was considered the ideal school building. An auditorium was added in 1936, as well as an east wing/gymnasium in 1954. Even with the addition of the east wing, the population grew so large that the space the school could provide was not enough. To cope with space issues the high school was moved to its current location in 1966.
The old high school building became the Northfield Middle School, until the middle school was moved next to the high school in 2004. The old middle school building is currently The Weitz Center for Creativity belonging to Carleton College.

Academics

At Northfield High School, students attend seven class periods on a two semester schedule.  Students are required to have a minimum of 23 credits to graduate. Some courses such as English, Social Studies, Science, and Math are required. Students also need Physical Education, Art, and Health.  There are also many electives a student can choose from ranging in a variety of topics from Child Care and Development, to Business, to Auto Shop classes.

Advanced Coursework

Northfield High school offers sixteen Advanced Placement (AP) classes, and eleven Honors/Advanced Courses.  Students have the choice of taking Advanced courses in many areas, such areas are History, Math, Science, and Art.

LINK Program

Northfield High School has a Link Crew transition program, which strives to welcome the freshman class on the first day of school as well as continue to support them throughout their first year of high school. Link leaders are a group of Juniors and Seniors who apply for this position.  Of the ones that are selected they undergo a vigorous training session, and are then assigned to a small group of incoming freshman students.  They are with this same group of freshman for the entire school year.  They meet with their group periodically throughout the year and also have a few different events that take place outside of the school day.  The goal of Link Crew is to help students achieve academic success and to make personal connections with them.

English Language Learners

Students whose primary language is not English are eligible for individualized instructional services.  To be able to qualify for these services the student's parent or guardian has to indicate that the student's first language learned was a language other than English, the student must also score as having limited English proficiency on nationally normed assessments of their English skills in reading, writing, listening, and speaking.

Extracurricular activities

Athletics
There are many different sports teams to choose from. The sports are offered in three different seasons Fall, Winter, and Spring.

Fall Sports
Fall sports include cheer team, cross country, football, boys'/girls' soccer, girls' swim and dive, girls' tennis, volleyball, and bowling.

Winter Sports
Winter sports include cheer team, dance team, alpine skiing, Nordic skiing, gymnastics, boy's/girls' basketball, boys'/girls' hockey, boys' swim and dive, weightlifting, and wrestling.

Spring Sports
Spring Sports include baseball, softball, track, boys' tennis, and boys' and girls' golf and boys' and girls' lacrosse.

Music
Northfield High School offers band, choir, orchestra, and Jazz Band.

Drama
Northfield High School has an excellent drama department, every year there is a Fall play, a Spring play, and a One Acts festival.  Every other year the fall play is a musical.

Clubs
There are many different clubs for students to be involved in. Clubs include Chess team, Diversity club, Knowledge bowl, Math team, Mock trial, Music Listening team, Robotics team, Science Olympiad, Speech team, Student Council, National Honor Society, Ski club, Fellowship of Christian Athletes, and R.A.L.I.E.

Notable alumni
 Sylvia Chase, radio and television journalist
 Alexandra Holden, actress
 Siri Hustvedt, novelist
 Hannah Lewis, scholar
 Preston Lewis Professional Carpenter
 Chad Setterstrom, American football player

See also
 Northfield, Minnesota

References

External links
 Nfld.k12.mn.us/nhs/

Public high schools in Minnesota